The Markaz (literally "the center"), originally The Levantine Cultural Center, was a nonprofit organization in Los Angeles, which existed from 2001 until 2020. It offered artistic and educational programs focusing on the Middle East and North Africa, with classes and workshops for ethnic communities.

History
The center was founded in 2001 by a group of activists, artists and business professionals. Its original name was Levantine Cultural Center, but it changed its name to The Markaz at the end of June 2015. It presented artistic, educational, and outreach programs related to the  Middle East and North Africa regions.

The organization lost 501(c)(3) status on April 15, 2014, for failing to file Form 990s for three consecutive years. 

The center was closed in May 2020 due to the COVID-19 pandemic, and the organization instead founded an online journal, The Markaz Review.

Activities
The center produced or cosponsored artistic programs encouraging cross-cultural and multidisciplinary collaborations, and collaborates with the multi-faith Pico Union Project.

Authors, artists and producers have collaborated with the center. Other activities included open evenings about Islam.

References

External links 
 Official web site

Arab-American culture in California
Armenian-American culture in Los Angeles
Culture of Los Angeles
Middle Eastern-American culture in California
North African American culture in California
2001 establishments in California
Organizations established in 2001